Ghulam Murtaza Syed (17 January 1904 – 25 April 1995), known as G. M. Syed  was a prominent Sindhi politician, who is known for his scholarly work, passing only constitutional resolution in favor of the establishment of Pakistan from British India's Sindh Assembly (which is now Sindh Assembly) in 1943. Later proposing ideological groundwork for separate Sindhi identity and laying the foundations of Sindhudesh movement. He is regarded as one of the founding fathers of modern Sindhi nationalism.  

He was known by the people of Sindh as "Saeen". 

G.M Syed started his political career at the age of 16, when he organised Khilafat Conference at his hometown, Sann, on 17 March 1920. Syed  was one of the earliest Sindhi politician who sought the creation of Islamic Pakistan, and became a vocal supporter of the Two-Nation Theory, advocated by the Muslim League leader Muhammad Ali Jinnah; Syed Sindhi's religious zeal for a purely Islamic state is witnessed after the Manzilgah incident, where he wanted to cleanse Sindh of its Hindus, stating: "all Hindus shall be driven out of Sindh like the Jews from Germany". However, once the independent nation was formed, he became a political prisoner of the state in 1948, due to differences with the country's leadership. He restated the political implementation of Sufi ideologies which advocated for Islamic principles, secularism, Sindhi nationalism and laid the basis for Sindhudesh Movement. He spent approximately thirty years of his life in imprisonment and house arrests for his political views. He was entitled as the prisoner of conscience by Amnesty International in 1995. He died during his house arrest in Karachi on 26 April 1995.

Early life

Childhood: 1904–15
G.M. Syed was born to the Sadat family of Sindh in the town of Sann on 17 January 1904. Syed  was an infant when his father Syed Mohammed Shah Kazmi was killed due to a family feud on 1 November 1905. After the death of his father, Syed  was the only male infant in the family, therefore in 1906 the British Government took his family property in its custody and his family was given the monthly pension by the Court of Wards. He was admitted to a primary school at the age of six and completed his 5 years of primary education in Sindhi, in the year 1915. The female elders of his family and Mother Haneefa Bibi decided to home-school him in order to safeguard him from family feud and enmity as he was the only male heir in the family. He was taught Persian and English at home.

Teenage: 1920–24
G.M Syed started his politics from participating in the Khilafat Movement. He first attended Khilafat Conference held on 7th, 8th, and 9 February 1920 in Larkana. He was inspired by the speeches of Abul Kalam Azad, Abdul Bari Firangi Mahali, Maulana Shaukat Ali and Shaikh Abdul Majeed Sindhi. He himself called upon the next Khilafat Conference on 17 March 1920 in his hometown Sann. Two days after this conference, his native town Sann observed a shutter-down strike in protest against the injustices of the Allied Powers against the Ottoman Caliphate on 20 March 1920. He remained active throughout the entire Khilafat Movement afterward.
He addressed the Khilafat Conference held on 26 March 1920, in Makhdoom Bilawal's Mausoleum as the youngest speaker. He was of a short-height and stood upon a wooden chair to be visible to the audience during his speech. He met Mahatma Gandhi on 27 April 1921 at the Sann railway station while Mr. Gandhi was traveling from Dadu to Hyderabad. Gandhi instructed him to wear Khadi. Syed  visited the office of the Collector in Karachi on 23 June 1921 to free his lands from the custody of Court of Wards but he was refused. He filed a complaint against the Collector and Mukhtiarkar on 4 December 1922, for hurdling the delivery of his lands from custody. 
Finally, he was awarded his lands back from the custody of Court of Wards in the year 1924, after two years of legal prosecution.

Political activism 
G.M Syed  was the founder of Sindh Awami Mahaz, which went on to join the National Awami Party (National Peoples Party). Like Ibrahim Joyo, Syed  blended Sindhi nationalism with Communism and Sufism through the ideas of Gandhi and Marx.

Syed Sindhi's position brought him ample opportunity to have free income through tributes, cash offerings and landed property. This lifestyle was rejected by him, subsequently he plunged into politics with enthusiasm. Politically, he evolved and traveled from Pan-Islamist to Indian nationalist and then Pakistani nationalist, having joined Muslim League; and ended with being a Sindhi nationalist.

AV School 
In the early 1920s, Syed  opened Anglo-Vernacular (AV) school in his village Sann, where education for certain language classes was free of cost. AV School offered combo of Sindhi education with English language. The school also offered options of Arabic, French and Persian languages. Prominent Sindhi educationist Ibrahim Joyo was also schooled at AV.

Timeline 
At the early age of fourteen years, Syed  started his career as an activist.
 In 1919, became Chairman of the School Board of his own tehsil.  He later became its President.
 In 1929, was elected as a President of Karachi District Local Board.
 In 1930, organized the Sindh Hari (Peasants) Conference and became its Secretary.
 In 1937, was for the first time elected a member of Sindh Legislative Assembly.
 In 1938, joined the All-India Muslim League. In 1940, he became Minister of Education in Sindh.
 In 1941, became one of the members of the Central Committee of the Muslim League.
 In 1943, became President of the Sindh Muslim League.
 In 1946, conditions compelled him to dissociate from the Muslim League, and formed a new party named the Progressive Muslim League. The same year, he was elected as leader of the Coalition Party in the Sindh Assembly.
 In 1954, acted as Chairman of Sindhi Adabi Board.
 In 1966, founded Bazm-e-Soofia-e Sindh.
 In 1969, formed the Sindh United Front.
 In 1972, formed Jeay Sindh Mahaz .

Jeay Sindh movement 

Syed  was the architect of "Jiy-e-Sindh" movement, aimed at achieving Sindhudesh. He is also the author of more than 60 books, (with) subjects ranging from politics, religion, culture, literature and commentaries on famous poet Shah Abdul Latif Bhitai. For his part as a political thinker, literary figure and mystic, he dominated the political arena of pre and post-partition era for decades, while he remained in jail for 30 years.

On 19 January 1992, Syed  was put under house arrest, his house was declared a sub-jail. He died on 25 April 1995.

Biography 
Syed  was the author of more than sixty books, written mainly in Sindhi, but also English and Urdu. His works are on numerous subjects, ranging from literature to politics, religion and culture. Due to his breath of knowledge, he bas been described by the Dutch scholar of Islam Oskar Verkaaik as "in many ways a remarkably productive, original, and largely autodidact intellectual, creating his own personal interpretation of Islam out of a range of intellectual influences such as 19th-century Islamic reform, Darwinian evolution theory, theosophy, 18th century Sindhi poetry, Marxism, classical Sufism, German idealism, and probably more."

Some of his well-known books are:

Janam Guzarium Jin Sein (In Sindhi language)
Dayar Dil Dastan-e- Muhabt (In Sindhi language)
Sindh Ja Soorma (In Sindhi language)
Sindh Speaks (English)
Struggle for New Sindh (English)
Religion and Reality (English)
Shah Latif's Message (English)
A Nation in Chains (English)

See also
 Abdul Wahid Aresar
 Bashir Ahmed Qureshi
 G.M Syed Edifice
 Shafi Muhammad Burfat

References

External links
Information about G M Syed
G.M. Syed on the "Unity and Diversity of Religion"

1904 births
1995 deaths
Pakistani writers
Sindhi people
Pakistani scholars
Pakistani Theosophists
Islamic philosophers
Muslim reformers
Leaders of the Pakistan Movement
Indian independence activists from Pakistan
Pakistan Muslim League politicians
Pakistani prisoners and detainees
Sindhi-language writers
Pakistan Movement activists from Sindh